"Kingston Town" is a 1970 song by Lord Creator released as a single on producer Clancy Eccles' Clandisc label. It was also recorded in 1989 by reggae group UB40 and was released as the second single from their album Labour of Love II, reaching number four on the UK Singles Chart and number one in France and the Netherlands.

In June 2007, the copyright holders of the song, Sparta Florida Music Group, started legal action against Paris Hilton and Warner Chappell Music for plagiarism due to alleged similarities between "Kingston Town" and Hilton's song "Stars Are Blind". It was wrongly stated that UB40 was the suing party, which the band later confirmed as being incorrect on their website.

UB40 version

English reggae band UB40 covered "Kingston Town" in 1989 and released it as a single in early 1990. It became the group's sixth top-five hit on the UK Singles Chart, peaking at number four for three weeks in April 1990. Throughout the rest of 1990, the song charted in a number of countries, topping the Dutch Top 40 for two weeks in May and the French Singles Chart for three weeks in October and November.

In Australia, the song did not reach the top 100 on the ARIA Singles Chart during its original release. In 1991, after a re-release of "Here I Am (Come and Take Me)" reached number three, "Kingston Town" was re-released and peaked at number 17 on the ARIA Singles Chart. In the United States, the song was serviced to rhythmic contemporary radio on 17 October 1995, in tandem with the release of The Best of UB40 – Volume Two, but it failed to chart.

Track listings

7-inch single
A. "Kingston Town"
B. "Lickwood"

12-inch single
A1. "Kingston Town" (extended mix)
B1. "Lickwood"
B2. "Kingston Town" (7-inch version)

CD single
 "Kingston Town" (7-inch version)
 "Lickwood"
 "Kingston Town" (extended mix)

US CD and cassette single
 "Kingston Town" – 3:46
 "Superstition" – 5:18

Australian CD single (1991)
 "Kingston Town" – 3:49
 "Breakfast in Bed" – 3:15
 "If It Happens Again" – 3:42
 "Sing Our Own Song" – 4:05

Charts

Weekly charts

Year-end charts

Certifications and sales

References

 

1970 songs
1990 singles
1991 singles
UB40 songs
SNEP Top Singles number-one singles
Dutch Top 40 number-one singles
Songs about cities
Kingston, Jamaica
Reggae songs
Songs about Jamaica
Virgin Records singles